The Pyrenean chamois (Rupicapra pyrenaica) is a goat-antelope that lives in the Pyrenees and Cantabrian Mountains of Spain, France and Andorra, and the Apennine Mountains of central Italy. It is one of the two species of the genus Rupicapra, the other being the chamois, Rupicapra rupicapra.

Names
Spanish: rebeco, gamuza
French: izard/isard
Galician: rebezo
Asturian: robecu/robezu 
Catalan: isard
Italian: camoscio dei Pirenei, camoscio appenninico 
Basque: pirinioetako sarrioa
Aragonese: sarrio, chizardo

Subspecies

Description
Up to 80 cm tall, its summer coat is a ruddy brown; in winter, it is black or brown, with darker patches around the eyes. Both males and females have backward-hooked horns up to 20 cm in length. They browse on grass, lichens and buds of trees. Sure-footed and agile, they are found on any elevation up to 3000 m.

Conservation
Like other species of chamois, it was hunted almost to extinction, especially in the 1940s, for the production of chamois leather. The population has since recovered, and in 2022 was estimated to be about 50,000 mature individuals.

References

 Haack, M. 2002. Rupicapra pyrenaica. Animal Diversity Web. Accessed February 20, 2006.
 Pérez, T., Albornoz, J. & Domínguez, A. (2002). Phylogeography of chamois (Rupicapra spp.) inferred from microsatellites. Mol Phylogenet Evol. 25, 524–534.

Caprids
Fauna of the Pyrenees
Mammals of Europe
Mammals described in 1845
Taxa named by Charles Lucien Bonaparte